Sir Charles Kinnaird Mackellar  (5 December 184414 July 1926) was an Australian politician and surgeon. He served in the New South Wales Legislative Council from 1885 to 1925, with the exception of a period of 50 days in 1903 when he filled a casual vacancy in the Senate. He was the father of poet and writer Dorothea Mackellar.

Early life
Charles Mackellar was born in Sydney, the only son of Dr Frank Mackellar (a physician from Dundee, Scotland), and his wife, Isabella (née Robertson; widow of William McGarvie). Charles was educated at Sydney Grammar School and then moved to Port Macquarie district. After leaving school had spent several years working on the land. 

Around 1866, he studied at the University of Glasgow, graduated MB and Ch.M. in 1871. He then returned to Australia and registered with the Medical Board of New South Wales on 25 March 1872 and established a successful practice as a physician. Mackellar was honorary surgeon at the Sydney Infirmary and Dispensary 1873–77 (known as Sydney Hospital from 1881). 

In 1882, he was appointed the first president of the newly formed Board of Health, which brought him in touch with the poor of Sydney and the conditions in which they lived. Mackellar took much interest in his new position, and gave the new department a great start. Mackellar became very good friends with Normand MacLaurin, who joined the staff of Sydney Infirmary and Dispensary in 1873.

Political career

Mackellar resigned from his offices in August 1885, and on 8 September 1885 was nominated to the Legislative Council of New South Wales. He was vice-president of the Executive Council in the ministry of Sir Patrick Jennings from 26 February to 23 December 1886, and then Secretary for Mines until the government was defeated on 19 January 1887. But though a good administrator, Mackellar was not a party man, and possibly for that reason did not hold parliamentary office again. In 1903 Mackellar was appointed a Senator when Richard O'Connor was made a Judge of the High Court. Mackellar found, however, that he had too many interests in Sydney to be able to spare the time to attend the sittings which were then held at Melbourne. He consequently opted not to stand for a full term at the 1903 federal election, and not long afterwards resumed his seat in the Legislative Council of New South Wales on 26 November 1903.

Mackellar had been chosen as president of a Royal Commission to investigate causes of the decline of the birth rate; he was largely responsible for the report that was issued. He had for some time been interested in the care of delinquent and mentally deficient children and in 1902 was appointed president of the state Children's Relief Department. He published this year as a pamphlet, Parental Rights and Parental Responsibility, which was followed in 1907 by a thoughtful short treatise, The Child, The Law, and the State, an account of the progress of reform of the laws affecting children in New South Wales, with recommendations for their amendment and more humane and effective application.

In 1912 Mackellar visited Europe and the United States to study the methods of treatment of delinquent and neglected children, and issued a valuable report Treatment of Neglected and Delinquent Children in Great Britain, Europe, and America on his return in 1913. He resigned his presidency of the state children's relief board in 1916. He still, however, retained his interest and in 1917 published an open letter to the Minister of Public Health on The Mother, the Baby, and the State, and a pamphlet on Mental Deficiency, which shows his clear grasp of the subject was still apparent.

Other interests
Mackellar succeeded his father-in-law, Thomas Buckland, as a director of the Bank of New South Wales in 1896. Mackellar was later president of the bank for most of the years 1901–1923. Mackellar was also chairman of the Gloucester Estate Co., chairman of the Mutual Life & Citizens' Assurance Co. Ltd; he had been a trustee in 1911–14. He was also a director of Pitt, Son & Badgery Ltd, the Union Trustee Co. of Australia Ltd, United Insurance Co. Ltd, Royal Insurance Co. Ltd, Colonial Sugar Refining Co., Australian Widows' Fund, and Equitable Life Assurance Co. Ltd of which he was medical director. He was surgeon in the Volunteer Rifles from 1872; chairman of the medical section of the Royal Society of New South Wales in 1881; founding councillor and in 1883–84 president of the New South Wales branch of the British Medical Association; examiner in medicine at the University of Sydney in 1889–1901; vice-president and in 1907–14 president of the Sydney Amateur Orchestral Society; inaugural vice-president of the Royal Society for the Welfare of Mothers and Babies in 1918; and a member of the Australian and Athenaeum clubs, Sydney.

Personal life
He was knighted in 1912, and created a Knight Commander of the Order of St Michael and St George (KCMG) in 1916. 

He married in 1877, Marion, daughter of Thomas Buckland, who survived him with two sons and a daughter, Dorothea Mackellar, who became a famous poet and prose-writer. 

Mackellar's health and memory started to decline from 1923 and he died at Sydney, on 14 July 1926; he was buried in the Anglican section of Waverley Cemetery.

References

 

1844 births
1926 deaths
Australian surgeons
Members of the New South Wales Legislative Council
Members of the Australian Senate for New South Wales
Burials at Waverley Cemetery
Australian Knights Commander of the Order of St Michael and St George
Australian Knights Bachelor
Australian politicians awarded knighthoods
Australian people of Scottish descent
Protectionist Party members of the Parliament of Australia
20th-century Australian politicians
Presidents of the Bank of New South Wales